Mauve is a color.

Mauve may also refer to:

 Perkin's mauve, a dye
 Mauve (test suite), for software
 Mauve (album), by Ringo Deathstarr
 Anton Mauve, a painter
 Mauve (Fabergé egg)